Mary Ellen Trainor (July 8, 1952 – May 20, 2015) was an American character actress best known for her roles as LAPD psychiatrist Dr. Stephanie Woods in the Lethal Weapon films, newscaster Gail Wallens in Die Hard and Ricochet, and working mother Irene Walsh in The Goonies. She also appeared in numerous other well-known films including Romancing the Stone, The Monster Squad, Death Becomes Her, Forrest Gump, and Freaky Friday (2003).

Early life 
Trainor attended San Diego State University, where she studied broadcast journalism.

Career 
Trainor started her career working at radio stations KSDO as well as KCBS. Her first television appearance came in the 1983 Cheers episode "Father Knows Last", and her big-screen debut came the following year in Romancing the Stone. She frequently appeared in the films of Richard Donner and her ex-husband Robert Zemeckis.

In addition to her film work she had recurring television roles as Judy Lewis in Parker Lewis Can't Lose (1989–1991), as Eve Lukens in Relativity (1996–1997), and as Diane Evans in Roswell (1999–2002).

She has appeared in three films that have been selected for the National Film Registry by the Library of Congress as being "culturally, historically or aesthetically" significant: The Goonies (1985), Die Hard (1988) and Forrest Gump (1994).

Personal life and death 
Trainor was married to director Robert Zemeckis for 20 years, with whom she had a son, Alexander. She was good friends with producer Kathleen Kennedy, who worked with Steven Spielberg extensively and serves as President of Lucasfilm. Trainor introduced the two.

Trainor died on May 20, 2015, at her home in Montecito, California, from complications of pancreatic cancer. She was 62 years old.

Filmography

Film

Television

References

External links
 
 

2015 deaths
American film actresses
American television actresses
San Diego State University alumni
20th-century American actresses
21st-century American actresses
Deaths from pancreatic cancer
Deaths from cancer in California